Adobe Bridge is a free digital asset management app made by Adobe Inc. and first released with Adobe Creative Suite 2. It is a mandatory component of Adobe Creative Suite, Adobe eLearning Suite, Adobe Technical Communication Suite and Adobe Photoshop CS2 through CS6. Starting with Creative Cloud, however, it has become an optional component downloaded via Creative Cloud subscription.

Details
Adobe Bridge is often used to organize files by renaming a group of them at once, assigning colored labels or star ratings assigned to files from the respective Adobe software suite, edit embedded or associated XMP and IPTC Information Interchange Model metadata, or sort or categorize them based on their metadata. It can use these options through different versions of a file that is part of an Adobe Version Cue project. However, it lacks the photo editing functions of Adobe Photoshop Lightroom, which are carried out by the Camera Raw plugin, coming with Adobe Photoshop. Image files can be shown in different sized thumbnails, slide shows or lists. Each folder, which can be bookmarked, has a cache file for speeding up rendering time of images when viewing a thumbnail. The cache can be in one central location or in individual folders.

Adobe Bridge can be invoked from within all components of Creative Suite except Adobe Acrobat.

Coupled with Adobe Photoshop, Bridge can execute Photoshop's compatible automation plug-ins, scripts and Adobe Camera Raw filters on a group of images. A plugin for Photoshop called Mini Bridge adds a small file browser to Photoshop, although Mini Bridge can be used only if Adobe Bridge is running in the background.

Adobe Bridge is customizable using JavaScript. The Bridge scripting guide is available online as well as in paperback format.

Adobe Bridge initially allowed for access to Adobe Stock Photos, an online collection of stock photography images drawn from well-known stock photo houses. The service was discontinued on April 1, 2008 and reactivated in 2015 by the Fotolia microstock-site acquisition.

Currently, the minimum system requirements are Windows 10 (version 1903) or MacOS X 10.13.

Version history

Supported file formats 
The table below contains the supported file formats that can be opened or accessed in Adobe Bridge.

See also
 Digital asset
 File manager
 File system

References

External links

Bridge
Bridge
Image organizers
MacOS graphics software
Metadata
Windows graphics-related software